Karl Wilhelm Paul von Bülow (24 March 1846 – 31 August 1921) was a German field marshal commanding the German 2nd Army during World War I from 1914 to 1915.

Biography
Born in Berlin to the distinguished Prussian military family von Bülow, originally from Mecklenburg, he enlisted in the Prussian Army and was assigned to the 2nd Guards regiment of infantry in 1864. He saw action during the Austro-Prussian War in 1866 and gained distinction at Königgrätz. Von Bülow served through the Franco-Prussian War of 1870 as a junior officer, winning the Iron Cross Second Class. A Captain of the German General Staff in 1877, von Bülow was promoted to Colonel and assigned to the 9th Guards Regiment in 1894. In 1897, von Bülow was a major-general and became director of the Central Department in the German War Ministry. In 1900 he was promoted to lieutenant-general and in 1901 was appointed general commanding the Guards Division. He was Commander of the German III Corps from 1903 until his appointment as Inspector of the German 3rd Army in 1912.

Assigned to the German 2nd Army at the beginning of World War I in August 1914, von Bülow's army was part of the German force that invaded Belgium. He occupied Liège on 7 August and captured the fortress of Namur on 22–23 August. In France, von Bülow defeated General Charles Lanrezac of the French Fifth Army at Charleroi on 23–24 August and again at Saint-Quentin on 29–30 August.

As the 2nd Army and General Alexander von Kluck's 1st Army neared Paris from 31 August to 2 September, von Bülow, concerned about the growing gap between the two armies, ordered Kluck to turn the 1st Army on his right towards him. This decision, however, resulted in Kluck's advancing south and east of Paris, instead of south and west as specified in the Schlieffen Plan. Von Bülow crossed the Marne on 4 September, but was ordered to retreat to the Aisne after the successful counterattack by combined French and British forces against Kluck's 1st Army at the First Battle of the Marne from 5–10 September. Von Bülow was believed by the German public to be responsible for the German failure to capture Paris.

Von Bülow was promoted to Field Marshal in January of the following year. He suffered a heart attack two months later and a month after that, on 5 April 1915, he was awarded the Pour Le Mérite. He was allowed to retire in early 1916, living in Berlin until his death.

Decorations and awards
 Order of the Black Eagle with Chain (Prussia) – invested 18 January 1900
 Order of the Crown, 1st class (Prussia)
 Iron Cross of 1870, 2nd class (Prussia)
 Service Cross (Prussia)
 Military Merit Medal, 1st class (Prussia)
 Cross of Merit, 1st class of the Princely House Order of Hohenzollern
 Commander Second Class of the Order of Berthold I (Baden)
 Grand Cross of the Military Merit Order (Bavaria)
 Grand Cross with the Crown in Gold of the House Order of the Wendish Crown (Mecklenburg)
 Honorary Grand Cross of the House and Merit Order of Peter Frederick Louis (Oldenburg)
 Order of the Rue Crown (Saxony)
 Commander of the Second Class of the Albert Order (Saxony)
 Commander 2nd class of the Friedrich Order (Württemberg)
 Commander of the Order of Order of Leopold (Belgium)
 Grand Cross of the Order of Military Merit with Diamonds (Bulgaria)
 Knight Grand Cross of the Royal Victorian Order (United Kingdom)
 Grand Cross of the Order of the Sacred Treasure (Japan)
 Grand Officer of the Order of Saints Maurice and Lazarus (Italy)
 Grand Cross of the Order of the Crown of Italy
 Order of the Iron Crown, 2nd class (Austria)
 Grand Cross of the Order of Franz Joseph
 Commander of the Order of the Star of Romania
 Grand Cross of the Order of the Crown (Romania)
 Order of Saint Stanislaus, 1st class (Russia)
 Grand Cross of the Order of the Sword (Sweden)
 Order of the Medjidie, 2nd class (Ottoman Empire)
 Iron Cross of 1914, 1st class
 Hanseatic Cross (Lübeck)
 Pour le Mérite (4 April 1915)
 Grand Commander of the Royal House Order of Hohenzollern with Swords (22 June 1916)

Notes

References
Evans, M. M. (2004). Battles of World War I. Select Editions. .
Barbara Tuchman, The Guns of August, New York, 1972
Hiss, O.C. Kleine Geschichte der geheimen Presse, Berlin, 1946

External links 

FirstWorldWar.com Who's Who: Karl von Bulow

1846 births
1921 deaths
Military personnel from Berlin
People from the Province of Brandenburg
Karl von Bulow
Burials at the Invalids' Cemetery
Field marshals of Prussia
Field marshals of the German Empire
German military personnel of the Franco-Prussian War
German Army generals of World War I
Prussian people of the Austro-Prussian War
Honorary Knights Grand Cross of the Royal Victorian Order
Recipients of the Pour le Mérite (military class)
Recipients of the Iron Cross (1870), 2nd class
Grand Crosses of the Military Merit Order (Bavaria)
Grand Crosses of the Order of Military Merit (Bulgaria)
Recipients of the Order of the Sacred Treasure
Grand Officers of the Order of Saints Maurice and Lazarus
Recipients of the Order of Franz Joseph
Commanders of the Order of the Star of Romania
Grand Crosses of the Order of the Crown (Romania)
Commanders Grand Cross of the Order of the Sword
Recipients of the Order of the Medjidie, 2nd class
Recipients of the Iron Cross (1914), 1st class
Recipients of the Hanseatic Cross (Lübeck)